Jene Vickrey (born August 8, 1959) is a former Republican member of the Kansas House of Representatives, representing the 6th district. He served from 1993 until his resignation in July 2020 following his decision not to seek reelection in 2020, and is a former House Majority Leader and speaker pro tempore of the House of Representatives.

Vickrey has served in the American Legion Exchange Council, National Federation of Independent Businesses and Springhill Chamber of Commerce.  He was also a charter member of the Louisberg Rotary Club.  The American Conservative Union gave him a lifetime rating of 83%. On July 7, 2020, Vickrey resigned from the Kansas House of Representatives after having served for twenty-eight years.

Committee membership

2019-2021
Chairman of Insurance
Rural Revitalization
Education

2015
During the 2015 Legislative Session, Vickrey served on the following Committees:
 Calendar and Printing (Chair)
 Interstate Cooperation
 Legislative Budget
 Legislative Coordinating Council

2013-2014
During the 2013-2014 Legislative Sessions, Vickrey served on the following committees:

 Calendar and Printing (Chair)
 Interstate Cooperation
 Legislative Budget
 Legislative Coordinating Council

2011-2012
During the 2011-2012 Legislative Sessions, Vickrey served on the following committees:

 Calendar and Printing 
 Interstate Cooperation (Vice-chair)
 Joint Legislative Coordinating Council
 Legislative Budget

2009-2010
During the 2009-2010 Legislative Sessions, Vickrey served on the following committees:

 Transportation (Vice-chair)
 Education 
 Government Efficiency and Fiscal Oversight 
 Joint Legislative Coordinating Council

Elections

2012

Vickrey won re-election in 2012, running unopposed in both the August 7 Republican primary and in the general election on November 6, 2012.

2010

Vickrey won re-election to House District 6 in 2010 with no opposition.  He was also unopposed in the Republican primary.  The general election was on November 2, 2010.

2008
On November 4, 2008, Vickrey was re-elected to House District 6 with no opposition.  He raised $26,849 for his campaign.

Major donors
The top 5 donors to Vickrey's 2008 campaign:
1. Kansas Contractors Assoc 	$1,000 	
2. Burlington Northern Santa Fe Railway 	$500 	
3. Nolan, RC 	$500 	
4. Kansas Medical Society 	$500
5. Wal-Mart 	$500

References

Republican Party members of the Kansas House of Representatives
Living people
1959 births
21st-century American politicians
People from Louisburg, Kansas